Wellington Church is a congregation and parish church of the Church of Scotland, serving part of the Hillhead area of Glasgow, Scotland. The building is located on University Avenue, Glasgow, opposite the University of Glasgow.

Building
The building was designed by the architect Thomas Lennox Watson and built between 1883 and 1884 for the United Presbyterian Church of Scotland ("U.P."), which joined with the Free Church of Scotland to become the United Free Church of Scotland in 1900.

The exterior of church is notable for its magnificent neoclassical portico, complete with a colonnade of Corinthian columns in the style of an ancient Graecian temple. This neoclassical architecture was much favoured by United Presbyterian Church, in contrast to the Gothic Revival favoured by most other churches in the Victorian era.

History
The church's congregation was founded in 1792 as an "Anti-Burgher" congregation, which in 1820 became part of the United Secession Church (and in turn U.P. from 1847).

In 1828, they opened their own church building in Wellington Street near the centre of Glasgow.  The congregation had outgrown this by the 1880s, so the church commissioned a new building at the junction of Southpark Avenue and University Avenue on Gilmorehill, opposite the university which had moved from the city centre the previous decade. Given that the United Presbyterian Church had no parish boundaries it was not uncommon for U.P. congregations to relocate.

Current work

The church ministers to the surrounding Hillhead community, and to the staff and student body of the university which has grown to surround the church's site.  Although the university maintains its own chapel, the University of Glasgow Memorial Chapel, in the nearby Gilbert-Scott buildings, the Wellington hosts both religious and secular university events.  The church also hosts musical concerts, and recitals played on its original Forster and Andrews pipe organ.

The congregation is actively involved in social justice issues, such as the Make Poverty History campaign in 2005.  The congregation had previously won Scotland's eco-congregation award in November 2004.

In 2006, it was proposed that Wellington Church merged with the neighbouring congregation of Lansdowne Church. This was due to declining attendances at both congregations and the cost of maintaining the Lansdowne building. However, in June 2007 the congregation of Lansdowne rejected the proposed vote on the union at that time. 

Wellington Church is within the Church of Scotland's Presbytery of Glasgow.

Ministry
The currently vacant charge was led by Reverend Dr David Sinclair until September 2017. He was inducted to the charge by the Church of Scotland's Presbytery of Glasgow on 29 May 2008. He was formerly Secretary of the Church and Society Council of the Church of Scotland, based in the Church of Scotland Offices in Edinburgh.  Sinclair is the Presbytery of Glasgow's Moderator for the Session 2013/2014.

The previous minister was the Reverend Leith Fisher, who retired in October 2006 and died on 13 March 2009, following a road collision on the Isle of Arran. His memorial service held at Wellington was attended by over 1,000 people and was conducted by the Right Reverend David Lunan, Moderator of the General Assembly of the Church of Scotland.

Former ministers include: the Very Rev Ernest David Jarvis DD, minister of Wellington 1929 to 1958 and Moderator of the General Assembly of the Church of Scotland in 1954; and Reverend Maxwell Craig who served between 1973 and 1989.

See also

 1884 in architecture
 List of Category A listed buildings in Glasgow
 List of Church of Scotland parishes

Other churches nearby
Kelvinside Hillhead Parish Church
Jordanhill Parish Church
St John's Renfield Church

References

External links

 , the church's official website
 More info about the church
 Eco-congregation award

1884 establishments in Scotland
19th-century Church of Scotland church buildings
Category A listed buildings in Glasgow
Church of Scotland churches in Glasgow
Listed churches in Glasgow
Churches completed in 1884
Hillhead
Neoclassical church buildings in Scotland